Perawat Sangpotirat (born 18 October 1995), better known as Krist, is a Thai actor, singer and host. He is best known for his role as Arthit in 2016 Thai series SOTUS: The Series and as Natee in 2020 series Who Are You.

Early life and education
Krist Perawat was born on 18 October 1995 in Bangkok, Thailand. He graduated from Satriwitthaya 2 School and from the Faculty of Economics at Kasetsart University.

Career
Krist Perawat made his acting debut in 2016 with the Thai BL series SOTUS: The Series where he played the lead role of Arthit alongside Prachaya Ruangroj who played Kongphop.  The series catapulted both of them to stardom and gained a massive global following, thus giving birth to the PERAYA fandom (a portmanteau of their names PERawat and prachAYA).

In 2017, he played the lead role of Mek alongside Ramida Jiranorraphat in Teenage Mom: The Series which was based on a Thai webtoon named "Teen Mom". In 2017, he also starred in Senior Secret Love: Puppy Honey 2 in a supporting role.

In 2018, he once again portrayed the lead role of Arthit in the sequel of SOTUS: The Series, SOTUS S: The Series alongside co-star Prachaya Ruangroj.

On 11 June 2018, he released his debut single "Door, Air and a Good Day" (which would later be used in the soundtrack of TV show Mint To Be).

Later in 2018, he played the title character Mint in GMM25 show Mint To Be alongside Mook Worranit which was based on the novel of the same name and was simultaneously telecasted on Chinese video streaming website Tencent Video which garnered massive views in a short amount of time, partly due to his large Chinese fan following. It became one of the hottest Thai dramas in China.

On 4 March 2019, he released his second single "SKY" which he co-produced and wrote the lyrics for the rap section.

On 8 November 2020, on One 31, Krist worked together with Kluea as a MC for a music show titled "The Golden Song: Season 3".

On 1 April 2021, GMMTV launched "Boys Don’t Cry", a project including 9 male artists including Perawat. Each will release 1 song portraying heartbreak and displaying how men too could cry. He is the first to release his song entitled "Missing"  and released the official MV.

On 22 August 2021, "The Star Idol"  launched 2 MCs, Pakachon Vo-onsri and Perawat Sangpotirat.

On 12 Dec 2021, Perawat worked together with Kluea continually as a MC for "The Golden Song: Season 4"

Filmography

Film

Short Film

Television

Variety shows

Music video appearances

Musical

Events

Live events

Concerts

Fanmeeting

Master of Ceremonies (MC)

TV shows

Online

Discography

As a producer, writer and composer

Awards and nominations

References

External links
 
 

1995 births
Living people
Perawat Sangpotirat
Perawat Sangpotirat
Perawat Sangpotirat
Perawat Sangpotirat
Perawat Sangpotirat
Perawat Sangpotirat
Perawat Sangpotirat
Perawat Sangpotirat
Perawat Sangpotirat
Perawat Sangpotirat